The Saints Peter and Paul Parish Church (Iglesia Parroquial de los Santos Pedro y Pablo), commonly known as Calasiao Church is a baroque church located in Poblacion West, Calasiao, Pangasinan, Philippines. It belongs to the Vicariate of Sts. Peter and Paul under the Ecclesiastical Province of the Roman Catholic Archdiocese of Lingayen-Dagupan. The 57, 840 Catholics is under the pastoral care of Rev. Fidelis B. Layog, assisted by Rev. Isidro Palinar, Jr. and Rev. Raymund Manaois.

The Spanish-colonial-era Church was declared a National Cultural Treasure by the National Museum of the Philippines and the National Commission for Culture and the Arts.

Church history
Built in several stages from the 17th to 19th centuries by the Dominicans, the best-preserved Pangasinan church bell tower and some parts have been reconstructed because of earthquakes. The 17th Century Calasiao Dominican Provincial chapter church under St. Paul's patronage became Sts. Peter and Paul Parish under Fr. Juan Maldonado de San Pedro Martin as parish priest after 1621.

In 1763, Filipino rebel Palaris (Binalatongan or San Carlos) burned the church. In 1804. Bishop Miguel Garcia de Nueva Segovia presided over the 1773 Synod of Calasiao at the sprawling Convento (per Manila Provincial Council Acts of 1771 to implement Decrees). Archbishop Basilio Sancho de Santa Justa y Rufina convened the Council from May to November 1771.

Calasiao had a new church of 3 naves (89 varas or yards long, 22 wide and 18 high with 2 rows of windows) with a bell tower. But in 1841 to 1842, this church was destroyed and rebuilt by Father Dalman in 1852 and then burned and restored from 1853 to 1858 by Father Ramos Suarez. The March 16, 1892, earthquake damaged the church. Dominican Vicar Fr. Bonifacio Probanza left Calasiao in 1898.

The 1936 Christ the King saw a new church.  In 1945, the Lingayen cathedral and the archbishop's palace was temporarily transferred to Calasiao amid the miraculous 3 Liberation bombs thrown into the church and convent but failed to explode,

The earthquake July 16, 1990, destroyed its belfry. Msgr. Luis B. Ungson reconstructed the church's and restored the bricked front wall, antique statues and the ceiling's original floral motif.

Parish priests included, Fr. Juan Bello, Fathers Benigno Serafica, José Ferrer and Msgr. Oscar Aquino under Bishop Jesus Cabrera. The present Parish Priest is Fidelis B. Layog. Msgr. Luis Ungson is assisted by Fr. Ronwell Fabregas and by Fr. Jose R. Carino and Allen O. Romero.

At present, the church owns fully automatic bells or chimes which could be heard within 7- or 8-kilometer radius.

Description
Calasiao's prioririty status is due to its geographic representation of various regions across the nation, being one of the largest churches in Pangasinan.

The imposing Latin American-style facade of bricks and cement of Calasiao Church, today, is 88.3 meter long, 25 meters wide and 27.3 meters high. The sprawling convent is 75 meters long, 25 meters wide and has 2 yards. Its 5-storey octagonal brick bell tower (replica of the earthquake destroyed original on July 16, 1990) with architectural designs that slightly resemble those of the Southeast Asian Hindu-Buddhist Pagodas is 30 meters high.

The prized original retablos (and a classic altar) is ornately decorated with statues of saints. The Baroque-style carved, the painted ceilings and the magnificent overall exterior are preserved for centuries. The intricate sculpture has tone of the Renaissance age's undying European Art as demonstrated by the majesty of its ceiling or dome, walls and the altar from the aisle near the main door.

The magnificent structure's main door, the entrance to the church features some heavy details: "Iglesia Parroquial San Pedro Y San Pablo Calasiao, Pangasinan". The church's large wooden floors on the second floor was setting of Mga Kuwento ni Lola Basyang and the Sleeping beauty Episode. Outside, sculptures, could be found including the cave of the Nativity and the Sunico heritage bell on display and the Sacred Heart of Jesus.

Museo Calasiao, a mini museum stands on the right side of the church inside the sprawling convent which shows some vintage photos and history of the church. Its dome-kitchen structure separately engineered from the church and the convent is one of its odd and distinct features. Some parts of the church are currently being renovated as there are plans to promote it as a tourist attraction. Father Layog adds there are plans to put up a gallery so that visitors can appreciate the church’s historical value.

In front of the church and Convento are spacious parking areas for vehicles tightly guarded by a solid iron entrance gate. Some meters therefrom is the famous "Senor Divino Tesoro Shrine" with the miraculous statue of a crucified Jesus Christ (believed to grow in size).

Baroque church
As one of the Baroque Churches of the Philippines, the Parish Church of Saints Peter and Paul has been at the forefront of Philippine history-Spanish colonial rule. Its unique architectural design reflects the Spanish and Latin American architecture integration of indigenous Philippines works of art with Chinese style fusion. Its massive bricks or ladrillo had been designed to withstand revolts and rebellions, due to its fortresses facade.

Its massive retablo mayor is massive and complex woodwork is seen at the back.

Within the Pacific Ring of Fire, the Philippine Church of Calasiao, known as Earthquake Baroque, has powerful and most imposing buttresses and foundations but failed upon earthquakes' annihilations.

Declaration as a National Cultural Treasure
In 2001, Calasiao Church was declared as declared a National Cultural Treasure by the National Museum of the Philippines and the National Commission for Culture and the Arts under R.A. 4896 (as amended by P.D. 374 and R.A. 8492), on September 29, 2001. It is the 5th church to be declared as National Cultural Treasure. The Calasiao church (second in Pangasinan, following San Carlos') was adjudged as possessing "outstanding historical, cultural, artistic and/or scientific value and are representative of the original church-building orders of Augustinians, Franciscans, Jesuits, Dominicans, and Augustinian Recollects, and all the major regions of the country.

Image gallery

References

Bibliography
 Benjamin Locsin Layug, "A Tourist Guide to Notable Philippine Churches." (Pasig, Philippines: New Day Publishers, 2007), p. 83.
 The 2010–2011 Catholic Directory of the Philippines (published by Claretian Publications for the Catholic Bishops' Conference of the Philippines, June 2010)
 Blair, Emma Helen, d. 1911, ed. The Philippine Islands. (1493-1898)
 Coseteng, Alice M. L. “The Good Wood”. Filipino Heritage: The Making of a Nation. Vol. 4. Ed by Alfredo Roces. Quezon City. Lahing Filipino Publication. 1977-78.
 ”Marxist Sociological Perspective”. Art History’s History. Vernon Hyde Minor. Phaidon Press.1989.

External links

Roman Catholic churches in Pangasinan
Philippines
16th-century Roman Catholic church buildings in the Philippines
National Cultural Treasures of the Philippines
Spanish Colonial architecture in the Philippines
Baroque architecture in the Philippines
Dominican churches in the Philippines
Churches in the Roman Catholic Archdiocese of Lingayen–Dagupan